José Ignacio Bosque Muñoz (Hellín, Albacete, 6 August 1951) is a Spanish linguist. He is a professor of Spanish Philology at the Complutense University of Madrid; a position he has held since 1982. He has been a visiting professor at the University of Utrecht, Ohio State University, the University of Leuven, Sophia University and the University of Minnesota.

Career
He attended the Autonomous University of Madrid, where he was a student of Fernando Lázaro Carreter. He also studied semantics and pragmatics at Berkeley from 1974-1975. He is an expert on the Spanish language, from the standpoints of both traditional and generative grammar, and has given special attention to the relationship between vocabulary and syntax.

In 1999, together with Violeta Demonte, he published the Gramática Descriptiva de la Lengua Española, in three volumes. It is the most detailed work on the syntax and morphology of the Spanish language published to date. He was also the coordinator for the Nueva Gramática de la Lengua Española, published in 2009; the first such academic grammar since 1931.

Honors and awards
 Doctor Honoris Causa at the University of Alicante, the National University of Córdoba, the University of El Salvador and the American University of Nicaragua.
 Elected to Seat t of the Real Academia Española on 4 May 1995, took up his seat on 1 June 1997.
 Elected to the Academy of Europe (2011)
 Awarded the Alfonso Reyes International Prize (2012).

His work related to proverbs has been the subject of a scholarly study.

Selected works
 Sobre la Negación, Catedra (1980) 
 Problemas de Morfosintaxis, Universidad Complutense (1980) 
 Las Categorías Gramaticales, Sintesis (1998) 
 REDES: Diccionario Combinatorio del Español Contemporaneo (editor), Ediciones SM (2005)

References

External links
 Dialnet: Works by Ignacio Bosque
 Text of his acceptance speech at the Royal Spanish Academy

Spanish philologists
Academic staff of the Complutense University of Madrid
Autonomous University of Madrid alumni
Members of the Royal Spanish Academy
1951 births
Living people
People from Hellín